Vudha Bhirombhakdi (born 13 May 1934) is a Thai business executive. He is a third-generation member of the Bhirombhakdi family, and serves as chairman of Boon Rawd Brewery, one of Thailand's largest beer corporations.

Vudha is the elder of two sons of Vidya Bhirombhakdi, the adopted son of the family patriarch Phraya Bhirombhakdi. He graduated in engineering from the HTL Bohne in Munich (now part of the Munich University of Applied Sciences), and joined the company overseeing its production facilities, as well as the construction of its Khon Kaen brewery. He is currently chairman of the board, following the death of his uncle Chamnong in 2015, while his cousin Santi serves as CEO.

He is also a former sports shooter. He won a silver medal in the trap event at the 1974 Asian Games, and competed in the mixed trap event at the 1984 Summer Olympics.

He was married to Khunying Oranuch Bhirombhakdi; they have four children: Vudtinun, Voravud, Nathawan Teepsuwan and Thanavud.

References

1934 births
Living people
Vudha Bhirombhakdi
Vudha Bhirombhakdi
Vudha Bhirombhakdi
Vudha Bhirombhakdi
Shooters at the 1984 Summer Olympics
Shooters at the 1974 Asian Games
Asian Games medalists in shooting
Vudha Bhirombhakdi
Medalists at the 1974 Asian Games
Place of birth missing (living people)